Challenger was a wooden clipper ship built in 1852 by Richard & Henry Green, in their Blackwall Yard for Hugh Hamilton Lindsay, London. She was the 291st ship built by the yard and was a remarkable departure from the previous ships produced. In 1850 the American clipper ship Oriental visited West India Docks, the largest clipper ship to visit London and the Admiralty was given permission to take her lines, and this was done by Messrs Waymouth and Cornish, both Lloyd's Surveyors, in the dry dock at Green's Yard in Blackwell. This is probably the reason that it was said that Challengers design was inspired by and had a close resemblance to the Orientals.

From The Copartnership Herald, Vol. I, no. 8 (October 1931)

On 8 August 1853 Captain James Killick commenced another race with Challenger against the American clipper Nightingale from Shanghai. Challenger reached Deal on the 26 November, 2 days earlier than Nightingale.

Under Captain James Killick's command Challenger took an average journey time from Shanghai and Hankow of 115 days. After he relinquished command this extended to an average of 129 days.

Between 14 June and 20 October 1863 Challenger sailed from Hankow to London in 128 days with a cargo of tea at £7 10s to £8 per ton.

She measured 174'×32'×20' and tonnage 699 NM, 649,74 GRT & NRT, and 614,07 tons under deck.

She was designed for the China tea trade.

In 1865 Challenger was purchased by Killick Martin & Company and operated by them until 1868. Killick Martin & Company was founded by the former Captain of Challenger James Killick.

In 1868 she was sold to William Stewart, London, but sold four days later to John Grice, Thomas Grice & James Septimus Grice, London.

She was sold again in 1871 and transferred to Melbourne, but abandoned shortly afterward at 48°N, 13°W, southwest of the port of Plymouth, England.

In July 1984 Killick Martin & Company were presented with a painting by artist Hugh Spink of Challenger by Ben Line Agencies to commemorate their 100th Anniversary of representing them as Liner Agents in London.

During the 1980s until 1999, 42 Adler Street in Aldgate was occupied by Challengers  former owners Killick Martin & Company Ltd and the building was named "Challenger House". The building is still there today, retains the name Challenger House and is leased to Qbic, who operate a 171-room hotel at the site.

Memorial

She is commemorated by a bas relief, on the side of the statue of Richard Green. The statue stands outside the Poplar Baths in London, not far from where she was built.

External links
Challenger 1852

References

 It Is Not Death to Die; Jim Cromarty; OMF books 2001
 The China Bird: The History of Captain Killick, and the Firm He Founded, Killick Martin & Company; David MacGregor; Conway Maritime Press. .
 The Tea Clippers 1833-1875; David MacGregor; 
 The China Clippers; Basil Lubbock; 1914.

Tea clippers
Tall ships of the United Kingdom
Individual sailing vessels
Victorian-era merchant ships of the United Kingdom
Ships built by the Blackwall Yard
1852 ships